Musa johnsii is a species of wild banana (genus Musa), native to western New Guinea. It is placed in section Callimusa (now including the former section Australimusa), having a diploid chromosome number of 2n = 20.

References

johnsii
Plants described in 2001
Endemic flora of New Guinea
Flora of Western New Guinea